Rupert II of Laurenburg,   (died ) was count of Laurenburg and one of the ancestors of the House of Nassau.

Rupert was a son of count Rupert I of Laurenburg and Beatrix of Limburg, a daughter of Walram II the Pagan, Count of Limburg and Duke of Lower Lorraine, and Jutta of Guelders (daughter of count Gerard I of Guelders).

Rupert is mentioned as count of Laurenburg between 1154 and 1158. He ruled together with his brother Arnold II. Rupert and Arnold were, together with their mother, last mentioned in a charter dated 1 April 1158.

Uncertainty about wife and children 
Due to the lack of data, there is much unknown about the early counts of Laurenburg and Nassau, including the exact family relationships. Maybe the wife of Rupert was also called Beatrix, but no marriage has been mentioned of him. As the uncle of count Rupert III of Nassau, Rupert II could very well have been the father of count Walram I of Nassau, who then, as cousin, succeeded count Herman of Nassau, the son of Rupert III.

Sources 
 This article was translated from the corresponding Dutch Wikipedia article, as of 2018-08-25.

References

External links 
 Family tree of the early House of Nassau.
 Nassau in: Medieval Lands. A prosopography of medieval European noble and royal families

House of Nassau
12th-century people of the Holy Roman Empire
1150s deaths
Year of birth unknown
Year of death uncertain